Instituto Atlético Central Córdoba (commonly referred to as Instituto de Córdoba) is an Argentine sports club from the city Córdoba, whose professional football team currently plays in the Primera, the first division of the Argentine football league system.

Famous players who have played at Instituto include Osvaldo Ardiles, Mario Alberto Kempes, José Luis Saldaño, Hugo Curioni, Alberto Beltrán, Raúl Chaparro, Salvador Mastrosimone, Marcelo Bielsa, Ernesto Corti, Diego Klimowicz, Mauricio Caranta, Oscar Dertycia, Alejandro Faurlín, Gonzalo Bergessio, Daniel Jiménez, Paulo Dybala, Ramón Ábila, Silvio Romero.

The basketball team currently plays at Liga Nacional de Básquetbol (LNB), the first division of Liga Nacional de Básquetbol league system.

History 
As many other football clubs in Argentina, Instituto was founded by railway workers. The club was initially established in 1918 as Instituto Ferrocarril Central Córdoba.
With the re-organization of the administration of the club 6 years later, due to the number of members in the Alta Córdoba neighbourhood, the name was changed to the current Instituto Atlético Central Córdoba.

After its foundation, Instituto quickly reached the first division of the Liga Cordobesa, which the team won in 1925, 1926, 1927 and 1928. With the professionalization of the game in 1931, Instituto lost momentum and sunk into an unsuccessful period.
But years later the team revived, conquering the provincial league again in 1961, 1966, and finally in 1972, reaching the Argentine second division.

Instituto played its first ever season at the top level in 1973 where the team finished 8th out of a group of 15 teams, but it had to wait six years to try again. In 1979 Instituto won its group to reach the Quarter-Finals where the club was eliminated 5–3 on aggregate by Club Atlético Tucumán.
Instituto also played the Torneo Nacional from 1981 to 1985, and the Metropolitano in 1981, 1982 and 1983. After the reorganisation of 1985 Instituto played all 5 of the long seasons although it was relegated at the end of the 1989–90 season.

The club then had to wait until the 1999–00 season to play in the top flight again. Instituto promoted to Argentine Primera División after winning the 1998–99 Nacional B tournament.
Nevertheless, the club would be relegated from the first division the next season, finishing 16th out of 20 teams in the Apertura and 12th in the Clausura, but Instituto was finally relegated after a 2–1 play-off defeat at the hands of Almagro.
The club won its second title, the Primera B Nacional 2003 Apertura, and promoted back to first division after getting the revenge over Club Almagro in a 2 legged play-off in 2004.
The club survived one season at the top level after winning a two legged promotion/relegation play-off against Huracán by a score of 3–1.
In its 2nd season in the first division, Instituto finished 19th overall and was automatically relegated back to B Nacional.
The 1986–87 season was probably the most successful season in team's history, having finished 8th overall.

Roberto Castoldi replaced Gastón Defagot as president on 26 August 2019.

Stadium
The club currently plays in Estadio Presidente Perón in which is located in the neighborhood of Alta Cordoba. The origin of its name comes from Juan Perón, President of Argentina during the construction stage. The club has had a number of other homes in their history, all based in the city of Cordoba.

Players

Current squad
As of 15 March 2023.

Out on loan

Managers

 1973: Enrique García
 1979–81: Alfio Basile
 1982: Sebastián Viberti
 1983–84: Oscar Ceders
 1985–87: Carlos Montes
 1988: Mario Zanabria
 1988–89: Jorge Domichi
 1990: René Arregui
 1990–91: Raúl Arraigada
 1991–93: Salvador Ragusa
 1993: Raúl Arraigada
 1994: Jorge Ginarte
 1995: Carlos Biasutto
 1995–96: Jorge Luis Ghiso
 1996: Horacio Bongiovanni
 1997: Ramón Adorno
 1997: Angel Celoria
 1997–98: Juan José López
 1999–00: Ernesto Corti
 2000: Juan José López
 2000–01: Gerardo Martino
 2001–02: Ernesto Corti
 2002: Carlos Compagnucci
 2002–04: Héctor Rivoira
 2004: Ricardo Rezza
 2005: Luis Garisto
 2005: Fernando Quiroz
 2005: Jorge Theiler
 2005: Ramón Alvarez
 2006: Ariel Cuffaro Russo
 2006: Ramon Alvarez & Sergio González
 2006: Fernando Quiroz
 2006–07: Eduardo Anzarda
 2007: Héctor Rivoira
 2007–09: Jorge Luis Ghiso
 2009–10: Marcelo Bonetto
 2010–11: Claudio Vivas
 2011: Ramon Alvarez & Alberto Beltrán
 2011–12: Darío Franco
 2012: Leonardo Nadaya & Elvio Agüero
 2012–13: Frank Darío Kudelka
 2013–14: Elvio Agüero
 2014: Daniel Jiménez
 2014–2015: Carlos Mazzola
2015–: Héctor Rivoira

Titles

Nacional
Primera B Nacional (2): 1998–99, 2003–04

Regional
 Liga Cordobesa de Fútbol (8): 1925, 1926, 1927, 1928, 1961, 1966, 1972, 1990
 Liga Cordobesa Segunda División (4): 1919, 1920, 1941, 1946

References

External links

 

 
Association football clubs established in 1918
Football clubs in Córdoba Province, Argentina
I
1918 establishments in Argentina
Basketball teams established in 1918